Kim Ju-hwan may refer to:
 Kim Ju-hwan (footballer, born 1982)
 Kim Ju-hwan (footballer, born 2001)